Angela Zuckerman (born March 24, 1965) is an American former speed skater. She competed at the 1992 and 1994 Winter Olympics with the best result of 19th place over 3000 m in 1994.

Zuckerman debuted internationally at the 1982 World Junior Championship, where she placed seventh all-around, and third at the 1,500 meters. In 1987 she met the French speed skater Jérôme Davre, at a World Cup; their long-distance relationships ended up in marriage after the 1992 Olympics. Zuckerman graduated with a major in zoology from the University of Calgary. Her sister Laura was also a competitive speed skater.

References

External links
 

1965 births
Living people
American female speed skaters
Olympic speed skaters of the United States
Speed skaters at the 1992 Winter Olympics
Speed skaters at the 1994 Winter Olympics
Sportspeople from St. Louis
21st-century American women